Sunbird may refer to:
 The bird family Nectariniidae
 The Pontiac Sunbird, one of two kinds of car made by General Motors
 The Holden Sunbird, a mid-sized sedan automobile
 Sunbird, a person, especially an older person, who moves to a more desirable climate
 Mozilla Sunbird, a calendar and scheduling program
 The Sunbird, a book by Wilbur Smith
 Sunbird, a children's imprint of Penguin Group
 Three-legged crow, a Chinese mythological bird with association to the sun
 Sunbird, a spell in the MMORPG Wizard101
 Sunbird (album)
Sunbird, a short story by Neil Gaiman

See also
"Sun Bird", a 1908 intermezzo
Golden Sun Bird, an ancient Chinese artifact